The men's decathlon event of the 2003 Pan American Games took place on Tuesday 5 August and Wednesday 6 August 2003.

Medalists

Records

Results

Notes

See also
2003 Decathlon Year Ranking
2003 Hypo-Meeting
2003 World Championships in Athletics – Men's decathlon
Athletics at the 2003 Summer Universiade – Men's decathlon
Athletics at the 2004 Summer Olympics – Men's decathlon

References
Results

Decathlon
2003